Sir Paul Elmore Oliver Bryan  (3 August 1913 – 11 October 2004) was a British Conservative politician.

Early life
Bryan was born in Karuizawa, Japan, the seventh of nine children of The Rev Ingram Bryan. He lived in Japan until he was eight and then returned to England and was educated at St John's School, Leatherhead. He studied Modern Languages at Gonville and Caius College, Cambridge, where he took great interest in sport, playing cricket and rugby – he was scrum half in the college rugby team where he played alongside his friend Iain Macleod, the future Conservative Chancellor. After graduating he worked in Halifax, Yorkshire, where he met his first wife Betty Hoyle. They married in 1939.

Military career
Paul Bryan had a distinguished wartime career.  He served with the Royal West Kent Regiment during World War II. He entered as a private soldier and attained the rank of lieutenant-colonel gaining the Military Cross and the Distinguished Service Order (DSO).  In 1942 he fought first in North Africa as part of the Torch Landings. He was given command of 6th Battalion for the invasion of Sicily and then Italy in September 1943. For his "outstanding" leadership shown in the capture of Centuripe, Bronte and Monte Rivoglia in Sicily, he was awarded a DSO.  After leading his battalion at Monte Cassino, he finished the war as commandant of a training unit established at Barmouth, Wales. Here he brought his wartime colleagues Denis Forman and Fred Majdelaney as instructors.

Political career
After the war he worked in Sowerby Bridge where he started to take an interest in politics. He contested Sowerby in 1949, 1950 and 1951.
In 1955 he became Member of Parliament for Howden in the East Riding of Yorkshire, and later for Boothferry from 1983 until he retired in 1987. In 1956, Edward Heath, then Chief Whip, invited him to become a whip. He was vice-chairman of the Conservative Party 1961–65, a whip 1956 and 1958–61, and Minister for Employment from 1970 to 1972. Bryan was one of the first Tory MPs after the Labour victories of 1974 to suggest openly that it was time for Edward Heath to resign. In the leadership contest of 1975, he served on William Whitelaw's campaign committee. He was captain of the Parliamentary Golf Society and vice-chairman of the Conservative backbench 1922 Committee from 1977 to 1987.

Through his wartime friend Denis Forman he became involved in Granada Television where Sidney Bernstein invited him to join the board. He assembled the consortium which gained the licence for Piccadilly Radio in Manchester. He was chairman of Croydon Cable Television from 1985.

Having been brought up in The Far East he took a great interest in Japan and China. He was chairman of the All-Party Hong Kong Parliamentary Group from 1974 to 1987. He made many friends among political leaders and businessmen both in the colony and in mainland China. He took Chris Patten on his first visit to Hong Kong and later took great interest in the negotiations for the transfer of the colony to China. He took a practical approach to the negotiations. He had immense sympathy for the people of Hong Kong but believed that a handover to China was unavoidable; at the same time, he remained optimistic about the prospects for the colony under Chinese rule.

Personal life
He had three daughters: Dr Elizabeth Bryan, a paediatrian; Felicity Bryan, a literary agent and writer; and Bernadette Hingley who was one of the first women priests in the Church of England.

In 1971 he married Cynthia Duncan, daughter of Sir Patrick Ashley Cooper and the widow of Patrick Duncan and gained four stepchildren: Patrick, Alex, Ann and Emma Duncan.

He had a passion for golf which he learned from his first father-in-law James Hoyle. He played regularly at Ganton Golf Course until his last years. He was President of Ganton Golf Club. While he never considered himself a good golfer, he gained fame in 1962 by hitting two holes-in-one in one round. After his death, members of the club placed a bench, inscribed with his name, on the course from which you can see both the holes. He became a Knight Bachelor in 1972.

References

External links
'The Times Obituary'.http://www.timesonline.co.uk/tol/comment/obituaries/article493482.ece
'The Guardian Obituary' Obituary: Sir Paul Bryan
'The Independent Obituary' Sir Paul Bryan
The Times Guide to the House of Commons, Times Newspapers Ltd, 1950, 1966, 1983 & 1987
'The Telegraph Obituary', Sir Paul Bryan

'Guardian Obituary of his daughter Dr Elizabeth Bryan' Obituary: Elizabeth Bryan
'Independent obituary of his daughter The Rev Bernadette Hingley' obituaries: The Rev Bernadette Hingley

1913 births
2004 deaths
British Army personnel of World War II
Queen's Own Royal West Kent Regiment officers
Recipients of the Military Cross
Conservative Party (UK) MPs for English constituencies
People educated at St John's School, Leatherhead
UK MPs 1955–1959
UK MPs 1959–1964
UK MPs 1964–1966
UK MPs 1966–1970
UK MPs 1970–1974
UK MPs 1974
UK MPs 1974–1979
UK MPs 1979–1983
UK MPs 1983–1987
Alumni of Gonville and Caius College, Cambridge
Knights Bachelor
Politicians awarded knighthoods
Ministers in the Macmillan and Douglas-Home governments, 1957–1964